

Canadian Football News in 1891
On December 19, 1891, the Canadian Rugby (football) Union was formed as the new governing body of football in Canada. The CRU replaced the old CRFU of 1884-1887 and was to last until the birth of the Canadian Football League in 1958.

McGill beat Bishop's College 38-8 in an exhibition game on October 3, in Montreal.

Final regular season standings
Note: GP = Games Played, W = Wins, L = Losses, T = Ties, PF = Points For, PA = Points Against, Pts = Points
*Bold text means that they have clinched the playoffs

League Champions

Playoffs

QRFU Final

ORFU Semi-Finals

ORFU Final

Dominion Championship

References

 
Canadian Football League seasons